Kamai is a village in Belarus. It is located in the Pastavy Raion of Vitebsk Region, near the border between Belarus and Lithuania.

The village is famous for its fortified church of St. John the Baptist.

History 

The village is mentioned for the first time in the beginning of the 16th century, when it was a part of Grand Duchy of Lithuania. In 1550 it is a populated place in Ashmiany paviet of Vilna Voivodeship. In 1603-1606 Jan Rudomin Dusiacki built here a stone catholic church, dedicated to Saint John the Baptist. In 1643 a hospital for men and women was created.

In 1795 it became a part of the Russian Empire. In 1863-1864 inhabitants of the village took action in the national movement for independence against Russia.

In the Interwar period Kamai was part of Poland and after the World War II became part of Belarusian SSR.

After Belarus gained independence, it's a village in Pastavy Rajon. In 2000s it joined the state program for rural development and became an agrotown.

External links  

 Photos of Kamai at globus.tut.by
 Photos of Kamai at radzima.org

Villages in Belarus
Agrotowns in Belarus
Populated places in Vitebsk Region
Vilnius Voivodeship
Sventsyansky Uyezd
Wilno Voivodeship (1926–1939)